Neil Edward Willey (born 11 September 1976) is a male former international backstroke swimmer from England.

Swimming career
Willey represented Great Britain twice at the Summer Olympics: in 1996 (Atlanta, Georgia) and 2000 (Sydney, Australia).

He represented England principally in the backstroke events but also won a silver medal in the 4 x 100 metres medley relay event, at the 1998 Commonwealth Games in Kuala Lumpur, Malaysia.

Willey won several medals (silver and bronze) in the 1990s as a member of the British short course (25 m) relay teams. At the ASA National British Championships he won the 50 metres backstroke title three times (1995, 1997, 2001) and the 100 metres backstroke title twice (1995, 1997).

See also
 List of Commonwealth Games medallists in swimming (men)

References

1976 births
Living people
Male backstroke swimmers
English male swimmers
Olympic swimmers of Great Britain
Swimmers at the 1996 Summer Olympics
Swimmers at the 2000 Summer Olympics
People from Enfield, London
Medalists at the FINA World Swimming Championships (25 m)
Commonwealth Games bronze medallists for England
Swimmers at the 1998 Commonwealth Games
Commonwealth Games medallists in swimming
Medallists at the 1998 Commonwealth Games